Claudiu Vaișcovici (born 14 October 1962) is a Romanian former football striker.

Club career
Claudiu Vaișcovici was born on 14 October 1962 in Galați. He was brought at Sportul Studențesc București from junior club CSȘ Pajura, making his Divizia A debut on 4 April 1981 in a 2–0 victory against Universitatea Craiova. Afterwards, he had some heart problems, which kept him off the field for two years, until Ilie Hagioglu, the president of Divizia B club, Dunărea Galați noticed him in a friendly and gave him the chance to play for his team. In 1985 he transferred to neighboring team, Oțelul Galați which he hepled promote to the first league. In 1987 Vaișcovici went to play for Victoria București, where he also made his debut in European competitions, playing 4 games and scoring one goal in the 1987–88 UEFA Cup. In the middle of the 1987–88 season, he was transferred at coach Mircea Lucescu's team, Dinamo București in exchange for Marian Damaschin, where in his first season he scored 22 goals in 16 Divizia A games, including 6 goals in a 9–1 victory against CSM Suceava. In the 1989–90 season Dinamo won the title and the cup with Vaișcovici playing 21 Divizia A games in which he scored 14 goals and made 4 appearances in the cup, also the team reached the 1989–90 UEFA Cup Winners' Cup semi-finals with Vaișcovici playing 8 games in the campaign. After the 1989 Romanian Revolution, Vaișcovici alongside fellow Romanians Mircea Rednic and Gheorghe Nițu went to play in Turkey for Bursaspor. He then went to play alongside Lică Movilă in the 1991 Soviet First League for Zimbru Chișinău after which he finished his career playing in Divizia B for Progresul București and Dunărea Galați. During his whole career, Claudiu Vaișcovici played 125 Divizia A matches in which he scored 68 goals and made 18 appearances in which he scored 5 goals in European competitions.

International career
Claudiu Vaișcovici played 10 matches at international level for Romania, making his debut on 8 April 1987, under coach Emerich Jenei in a friendly which ended with a 3–2 victory against Israel. He played three games at the successful 1990 World Cup qualifiers, without being selected to be part of the squad that participated at the final tournament. Vaișcovici's last appearance for the national team took part on 31 August 1989 in a 0–0 against Portugal.

Honours
Dunărea Galați
Divizia B: 1982–83
Oțelul Galați
Divizia B: 1985–86
Dinamo București
Divizia A: 1989–90
Cupa României: 1989–90
Progresul București
Divizia B: 1991–92

References

External links

1962 births
Living people
Romanian footballers
Olympic footballers of Romania
Romania international footballers
Association football forwards
Liga I players
Liga II players
FC Sportul Studențesc București players
FCM Dunărea Galați players
ASC Oțelul Galați players
Victoria București players
FC Dinamo București players
FC Progresul București players
Süper Lig players
Bursaspor footballers
Soviet First League players
FC Zimbru Chișinău players
Romanian expatriate footballers
Romanian expatriate sportspeople in Turkey
Expatriate footballers in Turkey
Romanian expatriate sportspeople in the Soviet Union
Expatriate footballers in the Soviet Union
Sportspeople from Galați